Mohammed Wakil (born 6 February 1965), the Minister of State for Power in Nigeria, resumed office on 5 March 2014. He is also a member of Nigeria's National Assembly, vice chairman of the People's Democratic Party (North East), and lawyer.

Early life 
Wakil was born on 6 June 1965 in Damboa Local Government of Borno State and is a graduate of the law faculty of the University of Maiduguri, Borno State.

Political career 
During the Obasanjo/Atiku first democratic term (Nigeria’s Fourth Republic) from 1999 to 2003, Wakil was majority leader in the House of Representatives of the Federal Republic of Nigeria. He was also Speaker of the House of Representatives.

Awards 
Wakil was awarded Officer of the Order of the Niger (OON) and is a fellow of the  Nigerian Institute of Management, FNIM.

Personal life 
Wakil is married to Hajiya Falmata Mohammed, and they have six children.

References 

Living people
1965 births
University of Maiduguri alumni
Peoples Democratic Party members of the House of Representatives (Nigeria)